"Letter to a Phoenix" is a science fiction short story by American writer  Fredric Brown, about immortality. It was first published in Astounding Science Fiction in August 1949.

Plot summary

A 180,000-year-old man writes a letter to humanity as a whole, explaining the lessons he has learned while observing the rise and fall of multiple civilizations.

Reception

Literary scholar Jack Seabrook has described it as "(t)hought-provoking rather than exciting" and "perhaps (the) best" of Brown's stories focusing on "social or political commentary".

Vernor Vinge has said that he was "fascinated" by the story, and that it was the direct inspiration for the 1975 story "The Peddler's Apprentice" which he co-wrote with his then-wife, Joan D. Vinge.

James Nicoll, writing in 2018, felt that the story "has not aged well."

References

Short stories by Fredric Brown
Works originally published in Analog Science Fiction and Fact
1949 short stories